The Kathrine G. McGovern College of the Arts (KGMCA) is one of thirteen academic colleges at the University of Houston.  Established in 2016, the College of the Arts has approximately 1,500 students.

Schools
School of Art
Arts Leadership
Moores School of Music
School of Theatre and Dance

Centers
Arts & Technology Center
Blaffer Gallery
Center for Arts & Social Engagement
Cynthia Woods Mitchell Center for the Arts

Academics
The college offers degree programs in the following areas: Fine Arts, Music, Theatre & Dance.

External links
 Official Website

University of Houston
Art schools in the United States
Educational institutions established in 2016
2016 establishments in Texas